Lido Theatre usually refers to Le Lido, a cabaret and burlesque dance show establishment on the Champs-Élysées in Paris, France.

Lido Theatre or Lido Theater may also refer to:

 Lido Theater (Medellín), a Colombian theater in Medellín
 Lido Theatre (Canada), atmospheric theatre in The Pas, Manitoba